Little Britain is set in many fictional towns and cities in Britain. This is a list of the locations featured in the TV show.

Darkley Noone
Inhabitants: 
Vicky Pollard

The Rookery Cafe
Inhabitants: 
Ruth and her mother

Edinburgh or Glasgow
Inhabitants: 
Ray McCooney

10 Downing Street
Inhabitants:
Prime Minister Michael

Herne Bay
Inhabitants:
Eddie "Emily" Howard
Florence
Vic

Herby
(in the county of Northwestshire)

Inhabitants:
Lou Todd and Andy Pipkin

Phlegm
Inhabitants:
Mr. Mann
Roy
Margaret

Pox
Inhabitants:
Maggie Blackamoor and Judy Pike

Grope
Inhabitants:
PC Bryce
PC Rawlinson
Mrs. Harris
Wrong Mrs. Harris

Flange
Kelsey Grammar School, where "tomorrow adults, or 'children', are harvested"
(filmed at The Royal Masonic School, Bushey, Hertfordshire, England, UK)

Uncle Albert Hall
Pianist

Troby
Kenny Craig
Cathy

Sneddy
Dennis Waterman
Jeremy Rent
St George's Ambulance Nurses

Sessex
Marjorie Dawes
Paul, Pat, Meera, Tania, Dave

Scoffage
The home of Lindsay's Driving School (ex-policeman who still thinks he is a policeman, now a driving instructor)

Slut
Letty Bell

Bruise
Dudley Punt
Ting Tong Macadangdang

Llandewi Breffi
Daffyd Thomas

Throttle
Michael Dinner

Little Britain